The following highways are numbered 69A:

United States
 County Road 69A (Calhoun County, Florida)
 County Road 69A (Jackson County, Florida)
 Nebraska Recreation Road 69A
 New York State Route 69A
 County Route 69A (Cayuga County, New York)
 Oklahoma State Highway 69A (two highways)